Brebu Nou is a commune in Caraș-Severin County, western Romania, with a population of 86 people. It is composed of two villages, Brebu Nou and Gărâna (Wolfsberg; Szörényordas; until 1924, Volfsberg in Romanian).

At the 2011 census, 65.1% of inhabitants were Romanians, 30.2% Germans and 4.7% Hungarians. The villages were founded by Germans craftsmen from Bohemia.

References

Communes in Caraș-Severin County
Localities in Romanian Banat